High Strung is a 2016 American drama film directed by Michael Damian and written by Janeen Damian and Michael Damian. The film stars Keenan Kampa, Nicholas Galitzine, Jane Seymour, Sonoya Mizuno, Richard Southgate, and Paul Freeman. The film was released on April 8, 2016, by Paladin. A sequel High Strung: Free Dance was released in 2019.

Plot
Ruby is a classical ballet dancer who earns a scholarship to the Manhattan Conservatory of the Arts. She meets an edgy, British, moody young violinist named Johnnie who performs in the New York City Subway. While watching him play, two groups of hip hop dancers start a dance off, and Ruby gets pushed and she falls down. Johnnie gets distracted while helping her, and his violin and the rent money he earned busking are stolen. He gets very upset, stating the violin was given to him by his grandfather, who he seemed to have been close with, since he had a tattoo of his grandfather's death date on his bicep. Later, she tries to help him with a loaner violin from the Conservatory, but he tells her he doesn't want charity and seems to be accusing her of being a rich, entitled snob because she attends the Conservatory, not knowing she's on scholarship. She learns he is illegally living in the USA, which is why he didn't report the theft to the police or ask them for help to retrieve his violin. She also learns that there is a competition where a dancer performs with a string musician, and the winner gets a scholarship, which could qualify Johnnie for a student visa, and earn him 25 grand.

Ruby's scholarship is on the line because she is failing a mandatory contemporary dance class so she and Johnnie must find a way to save Ruby’s scholarship and keep Johnnie from being deported. Ruby's friend and roommate Jasmine "Jazzy" is also at risk of facing expulsion because she is repeatedly late for her classes because of partying late with her boyfriend. The two have a struggle with friendship over Jazzy's situation, and Jazzy ends up calling Ruby "you bitch!" Jazzy realizes her mistake, and starts to improve her dancing and habits. Meanwhile, Johnnie had paid an immigration attorney to help him get a green card but the attorney turns out to be a fraud. The situation is made more complicated by the rivalry of some other students (April and Kyle) entering the competition, one of which has a particular jealousy of Johnnie's talent, Kyle Endeca. Meanwhile, Johnnie makes up with Ruby after going into a violin competition at a gala with Kyle earlier, and the two kiss, starting a relationship. With the help of a hip hop dance crew living a floor beneath Johnnie, they must find a common ground while preparing for a competition that could change their lives forever. 

Right before the competition, Johnnie is taken in by the police, and he can be forgiven for illegally living in America if he helps them find out the fraud attorney. Ruby and the hip hop group are about to start the competition without Johnnie since he hasn't shown up, but he finally does show up. The group performs their dance and music. The judges have mixed feelings about the non-classical dance, and when the group finishes, no one claps. Finally, the audience erupts into clapping and whooping. The judges announce Ruby and Johnnie's group the winner, and everyone is happy, except for the rival team.

Cast
 Keenan Kampa as Ruby, a ballet dancer who learns at the MCA; she is the friend of Jazzy and the girlfriend of Johnnie Blackwell; she doesn't enjoy contemporary
 Nicholas Galitzine as Johnnie Blackwell, a British violinist who is Ruby's boyfriend and dislikes Kyle Endeca; he was close to his grandfather
 Jane Seymour as Oksana, the MCA Contemporary dance teacher; she has a liking for April, and seems to dislike Ruby; later, she reveals Ruby is too good, and she wants to push Ruby
 Sonoya Mizuno as Jazzy, Ruby's roommate, fellow dancer, and friend who is in danger of expulsion from school since she misses so many classes because she drinks and parties late night with her mysterious boyfriend. She also ends up sleeping with him and is late for class. Her relationships are shaky with her friend Ruby
 Richard Southgate as Kyle, a violinist at MCA, a boy who crushes on Ruby and dislikes Johnnie, seeing him as competition violinist-wise and also for Ruby
 Paul Freeman as Kramrovsky, the ballet teacher at MCA who was in concentration camps when young, and teaches Ruby the lesson of perfection; how it should never be achieved because imperfection drives perseverance and talent
 Maia Morgenstern as Markova
 Ian Eastwood as Rik
 Anabel Kutay as April, the possible girlfriend of Kyle, a good contemporary dancer who dislikes Ruby and has a traditional "perfect mean girl" personality.
 Marcus Emanuel Mitchell as Hayward Jones III
 Comfort Fedoke as PopTart
 Simon A. Mendoza as Ollie
 Miranda Wilson as Mary
 Dave Scott as Macki
 Andrew Pleavin as Slater
 Tomi May as Detective Mullen
 David Lipper as Sam
 Nigel Barber as Mr. Peterson

Release
The film premiered at the Santa Barbara International Film Festival on February 6, 2016. The film was released on April 8, 2016, by Paladin.

Songs featured in the film include "DJ Fav" by singer/actress Nia Sioux.

Reception 
On Rotten Tomatoes the film has a score of 75% based on reviews from 8 critics.

Sequel 
A sequel, High Strung Free Dance (also known as Free Dance), was released theatrically in October 2019, and on Netflix on May 31, 2020. Jane Seymour is the only cast member from High Strung to return for the sequel, which stars Harry Jarvis, Juliet Doherty, and Thomas Doherty.

References

External links
 

2016 films
2016 drama films
American dance films
American drama films
2010s English-language films
Films directed by Michael Damian
2010s dance films
2010s American films